Desa Muck (born 29 August 1955) is a Slovenian writer, children's writer and actor. She works as a freelance artist and writes newspaper columns, radio plays, but is best known for her juvenile fiction.

Muck was born in Ljubljana in 1955. She writes for children and teenagers and won the Levstik Award for her series of stories Anica in 2005.

Awards
 My Favourite Book by young Slovenian readers winner 2003, 2004, 2005, 2006 and 2007
 Večernica Award nominee 1996, 2001, 2003 and 2004
 Večernica Award winner 1998
 Levstik Award winner 2005
 International Board on Books for Young People (IBBY) Honour List winner 2006

Published works

Youth Literature

The Annie Series:
 Anica in grozovitež (Annie and the Monster), 2001 
 Anica in materinski dan (Annie and Mother's Day), 2001 
 Anica in zajček (Annie and the Bunny), 2001
 Anica in Jakob (Annie and Jacob), 2002 
 Anica in športni dan (Annie and Sports Day), 2002 
 Anica in velike skrbi (Annie and Great Worries), 2003 
 Anica in počitnice (Annie and Holidays), 2004 
 Anica in velika skrivnost (Annie and the Big Secret), 2004 
 Anica in prva ljubezen (Annie and First Love), 2005 
 Anica in skrivnostna maska (Annie and the Mysterious Mask), 2007

Other works for children and youth:
 Tistega lepega dne (That Fine Day), 1992
 Blazno resno o seksu (Deadly Seriously About Sex), 1993
 Pod milim nebom (Under the Open Skies), 1993
 Blazno resno popolni (Deadly Seriously Perfect), 1995 
 Hči Lune (Daughter of the Moon), 1995
 Blazno resno zadeti (Deadly Seriously Stoned), 1996
 Kremplin (Claws), 1996 
 Lažniva Suzi (Lying Suzy), 1997 
 Blazno resno slavni (Deadly Seriously Famous), 1998
 Fonton, 1998 
 Blazno resno o šoli (Deadly Seriously About School), 2000 
 Čudež v operi (The Miracle at the Opera), 2001 
 Sama doma (Girls Home Alone), 2001
 Kakšne barve je svet (What Colour Is the World), 2002
 Kokoš velikanka (The Giant Chicken), 2007 
 Ko se želva izgubi ... (When the Tortoise Gets Lost...), 2009

Adult fiction
 Panika (Panic), 2003
 Neskončno ljubljeni moški (The Eternally Loved Man), 2004 
 Pasti življenja (Life's Traps), 2005
 Peskovnik Boga Otroka (The Child God's Sandpit), 2006 
 Pasti življenja II (Life's Traps II), 2007
 Nebo v očesu lipicanca (The Sky in the Lipizzaner's Eyes), 2010

References

1955 births
Living people
Slovenian children's writers
Slovenian writers
Slovenian women children's writers
Slovenian actresses
Levstik Award laureates
Writers from Ljubljana